Tatardeh (also Romanized as Tātārdeh) is a village in Shivanat Rural District, Afshar District, Khodabandeh County, Zanjan Province, Iran. At the 2006 census, its population was 302, in 67 families.

References 

Populated places in Khodabandeh County